Alexander Leonidovich Goldstein (born , Tallinn, Estonia — , Tel-Aviv, Israel) — was a Russian writer and essayist. He was awarded the Russian Little Booker Prize, the Anti-Booker prize and the Andrei Bely Prize (posthumously, in the category for prose).

Biography and work 
Alexander Goldstein was born in Tallinn, the son of Leonid Goldstein, a man of letters. From his early childhood on, he lived in Baku, where he later studied literature at Baku State University. From 1991 he lived in Tel-Aviv.

Goldstein worked as a journalist for the newspaper Vesti, as well as other Russian-language publications, and sat on the editorial board of the Russian-Israeli journal Zerkalo. His articles were published in the books Расставание с Нарциссом (Parting from Narcissus) and Аспекты духовного брака (Aspects of Spiritual Matrimony). The first of these volumes, published in 1997, gained recognition as one of the most important books of the decade. For instance, the Russian literary academic Irina Prohorova wrote about Parting from Narcissus, and indeed Goldstein's work as a whole:He was the first to describe that peculiar time in which we partly continue to live, but perhaps have already left behind. In any case, beginning with his first articles and his first book, Parting from Narcissus, which marked a huge cultural upheaval in the middle of the 1990s, he was the first to have the courage to say certain things, to push back certain borders and barriers. What he tried to do (and it's even worth asking how he managed to do it) was to find the language of the time.
In the opinion of Sasha Sokolov:It seems he was only really appreciated by professionals. Living here and now, in Tel-Aviv, I remember our few meetings and frequently walk along Ben Yehuda Street, past his house... Sasha is difficult. He's not only difficult stylistically, but also philosophically. He offers up his immense knowledge without thinking of the reader, without glancing back at him – a knowledge of art, science, philology, naturally. I can understand the value of his texts, but I don't understand how they were made.
In 2002 moved into large-scale forms with Помни о Фамагусте (Remember Famagusta), a "novel in the Schlegelian sense." With time, he acquired the reputation of a refined stylist, erudite intellectual and thinker.

He died from lung cancer in 2006, the same year that his last novel, Спокойные поля (Quiet Fields) was posthumously published. A volume of his selected prose appeared in Hebrew translation in 2009, though he has yet to be translated into English.

The poet and essayist Alexei Tsvetkov remembered him with these words:...he had very few friends in the commonly accepted sense of the word – that is, people who could climb into each other's skin. He was one of those people who protect their own territory very well. Yet at the same time, as strange as it might seem, it was easier to talk with him than with many in this traditional "subcutaneous" category.
Mikhail Shishkin has frequently praised Goldstein's work and cited him as an inspiration. In an English-language talk at the Harriman Institute of Columbia University, Shishkin said:For me now, the top of Russian literature is Alexander Goldstein. [...] I'm sure in fifty years here at Columbia University and other American universities all professors will consider our time, our epoch, the epoch of Alexander Goldstein. And we, writers, will be just contemporaries of Alexander Goldstein. We just shared with him the epoch. [...] And if you asked me, "What Russian writers are important and genius nowadays?", I would say: "Read Alexander Goldstein".
Alexander Goldstein's wife – Irina Goldstein – was also a journalist.

Published works 
 "Расставание с Нарциссом" (Parting from Narcissus), М.,НЛО, 1997, 
 "Аспекты духовного брака" (Aspects of Spiritual Matrimony), М.,НЛО, 2001, 
 "Помни о Фамагусте" (Remember Famagusta), М.,НЛО, 2004, 
 "Спокойные поля" (Quiet Fields), М., НЛО, 2006 
 "Памяти пафоса" (In Memory of Pathos), М., НЛО, 2009

References 

 Most of the content of this article is a translation of the article on Alexander Goldstein from Russian Wikipedia.

External links 
In English:
 Review of Remember Famagusta
 Mikhail Kruitov, 'Memory Is Inseparable from Imagination', shma.com

In Russian:
 О Саше // Зеркало, 2006, № 27 
 In Memoriam// Новое литературное обозрение, 2006, № 81 
 Памяти Александра Гольдштейна // Критическая масса, 2006, № 3 
 Без гарантии возвращения. Станислав Львовский о романе «Спокойные поля»
 Борис Дубин. Четвёртая проза
 Жест в искусстве: Глеб Морев об Александре Гольдштейне
 Саша Соколов. О другой встрече
 Спокойные поля. «Зеркало» № 25, 2005 
 Спокойные поля. «Зеркало» № 27, 2006 
 Комета Гонзага. Из книги «Спокойные поля». «Критическая масса» № 3, 2006 
 Литература существования. Из книги «Расставание с Нарциссом» 
 Тетис, или Средиземная почта. Из книги «Расставание с Нарциссом» 
 «Аспекты духовного брака». Фрагменты книги 
 Страница на сайте Журнального зала 
 Страница на сайте «Вавилон»
 Статьи Александра Гольдштейна на сайте журнала «Сеанс»

1957 births
2006 deaths
20th-century Russian writers
Russian male novelists
Russian male essayists
Israeli writers
Baku State University alumni
Deaths from lung cancer in Israel
Soviet emigrants to Israel
20th-century novelists
20th-century essayists
20th-century Russian male writers
Burials at Yarkon Cemetery